The NAMES Project AIDS Memorial Quilt, often abbreviated to AIDS Memorial Quilt or AIDS Quilt, is a memorial to celebrate the lives of people who have died of AIDS-related causes. Weighing an estimated 54 tons, it is the largest piece of community folk art in the world as of 2020. It was conceived in 1985, during the early years of the AIDS pandemic, when social stigma prevented many AIDS victims from receiving funerals. It has been displayed on the Mall in Washington, D.C. several times. In 2020, it returned to the AIDS Memorial in San Francisco, and can also be seen virtually.

History and structure

The idea for the NAMES Project Memorial Quilt was conceived on November 27, 1985, by AIDS activist Cleve Jones during the annual candlelight march, in remembrance of the 1978 assassinations of San Francisco Supervisor Harvey Milk and Mayor George Moscone. For the march, Jones had people write the names of loved ones that were lost to AIDS-related causes on signs, and then they taped the signs to the old San Francisco Federal Building.  All the signs taped to the building looked like an enormous patchwork quilt to Jones, and he was inspired. The NAMES Project officially started in 1987 in San Francisco by Jones, Mike Smith, and volunteers Joseph Durant, Jack Caster, Gert McMullin, Ron Cordova, Larkin Mayo, Steve Kirchner, and Gary Yuschalk. At that time many people who died of AIDS-related causes did not receive funerals, due to both the social stigma of AIDS felt by surviving family members and the outright refusal by many funeral homes and cemeteries to handle the deceased's remains. Lacking a memorial service or grave site, the Quilt was often the only opportunity survivors had to remember and celebrate their loved ones' lives. The first showing of The Quilt took place on October 11, 1987 on the National Mall in Washington, DC, as part of the National March on Washington for Lesbian and Gay rights. The Quilt was last displayed in full on the Mall in Washington, D.C., in 1996, a display that included a visit by President Bill Clinton and first lady Hillary Rodham Clinton, but it returned in July 2012 to coincide with the start of the XIX International AIDS Conference.

The Quilt is a memorial to and celebration of the lives of people lost to the AIDS pandemic which marks it as a prominent forerunner of the twentieth century shift in memorial design that moved towards celebrating victims or survivors. The Quilt is still maintained and displayed by The NAMES Project Foundation.

In observance of National HIV-Testing Day in June 2004 the 1,000 newest blocks were displayed by the Foundation on The Ellipse in Washington, D.C. The largest display of The Quilt since it was last displayed in its entirety in October 1996, the 1,000 blocks displayed consisted of every panel submitted at or after the 1996 display.

In 1997, the NAMES Project headquarters moved from San Francisco to Washington, D.C., and in 2001 the quilt panels were moved from San Francisco to Atlanta, Georgia. The NAMES Project Foundation was headquartered in Atlanta.

In 2019, the organization announced that the Quilt would be relocating to San Francisco under the care of the National AIDS Memorial. In 2020, its archives were relocated to the American Folklife Center at the Library of Congress. The AIDS Memorial Quilt is warehoused in San Francisco when not being displayed, and continues to grow, currently consisting of more than 48,000 individual memorial panels (to over 94,000 people) and weighing an estimated 54 tons.

Goal and achievement
The goal of the Quilt is to bring awareness to how massive the AIDS pandemic really is, and to bring support and healing to those affected by it.  Another goal is to raise funds for community-based AIDS service organizations, to increase their funding for AIDS prevention and education. As of 1996, more than $1.7 million had already been raised, and the effort continues to this day.

Quilt construction and care
 panels made typically of fabric are created in recognition of a person who died from AIDS-related complications. The panels are made by individuals alone or in a workshop, such as Call My Name (which focuses on African American representation on the quilt) or in quilting bees, such as the one held during the 2012 Smithsonian Folklife Festival on the National Mall. Construction choices are left to the quilter and techniques such as traditional fabric quilting, embroidery, applique, paint and stencil, beading, and iron-ons are common.

Items and materials included in the panels:
 Fabrics such as lace, suede, leather, mink, taffeta, also Bubble Wrap and other kinds of plastic and even metal.
 Decorative items like pearls, quartz crystals, rhinestones, sequins, feathers, buttons.
 Clothing, such as jeans, T-shirts, gloves, boots, hats, uniforms, jackets, flip-flops.
 Items of a personal nature, such as human hair, cremation ashes, wedding rings, merit badges and other awards, car keys.
 Unusual items, such as stuffed animals, records, jockstraps, condoms, and bowling balls.

Panels are submitted to the National AIDS Memorial, along with a panel-maker identification form and a documentation letter. Occasionally, other supplemental material is donated along with the panel such as photographs of the subject. The information about the panel is recorded in a database.

Panels are backed in canvas and sewn together in blocks of eight. Grommets for hanging are attached and the blocks are numbered and photographed. The numbers help with identification and location in storage, on the quilt website, and when the quilt is displayed.

Quilt maintenance and Gert McMullin
The quilt is maintained, repaired, and managed by Hand Maidens of the Quilt. The most dedicated Hand Maiden is Gert McMullin. McMullin, chief quilt production coordinator for the NAMES Project Foundation, volunteered her anger-driven energy and sewing skills to Cleve Jones in the early days of the quilt in San Francisco. After witnessing and experiencing the deaths of so many friends from HIV, McMullin dedicated herself, working nights after her job at a Macy's cosmetic counter, to combat the invisibility her community felt. Materials and sewing machines were donated and McMullin and a group of volunteers worked in a storefront on Market Street. They created hundreds and later thousands of panels.

McMullin's first two panels were for her friends, Roger Lyon and David Calgaro. Her panel for Lyon was eventually accessioned into the collection of the Smithsonian Institution National Museum of American History (accession number 1998.0254.01) and was featured in the book The Smithsonian's History of America in 101 Objects.

When San Francisco became prohibitively expensive, the project, and McMullin, moved to Atlanta, Georgia.  McMullin returned to San Francisco in 2020 as the Quilt returned to the city where it originated under the care and stewardship of the National Aids Memorial. Gert continues to care for each Quilt panel and works with a team of Quiltmakers and caretakers to maintain and preserve each panel and organize displays around the country.

During the COVID-19 pandemic, Gert and her colleagues struck by the similarities of the COVID and AIDS pandemics, wanted to help those in need. They began making protective masks made from quilting fabric for first responders as a way to show their support and deal with their own grief and memories of loved ones being lost during the AIDS pandemic. They have made thousands of protective masks and delivered them to organizations throughout the San Francisco Bay Area.

Examples of panels
Those who submit panels do not have to know the person, but they do have to feel some sort of connection with the individual that they want people to recognize. For example, to memorialize Queen lead-singer Freddie Mercury, there were many panels made, two of which were a solid white background with a blue and black guitar, and "Freddy Mercury" written down the sides in black, with the AIDS ribbon above his name, and a purple silk with "Freddie Mercury", "Queen", and "1946–1991" in silver applique, along with two pictures of Mercury with Queen.

Many panels were also made for the actor Rock Hudson, one of which consisted of a navy blue background with silver "Rock Hudson" and stars, above a rainbow with the word "Hollywood".

Other panels are made by loved ones and then attached to make one large block. Some are flamboyant and loud, whereas some are more muted and simple.

Recognition and influence
 The NAMES Project was nominated for a Nobel Peace Prize in 1989.
 The Quilt is the subject of the 1989 Peabody Award- and Academy Award-winning documentary film, Common Threads: Stories from the Quilt, produced by Rob Epstein and Bill Couturié, and narrated by Dustin Hoffman.
 Songwriter Tom Brown wrote the song "Jonathan Wesley Oliver, Jr." about the Quilt in 1988.
 In 1990, John Corigliano's Symphony No. 1, inspired by The AIDS Memorial Quilt, premiered in New York.
 Elegies for Angels, Punks and Raging Queens, a song cycle developed in the late 1980s with music by Janet Hood and lyrics and additional text by Bill Russell,  features songs and monologues inspired by The Quilt.
 In 1992 The AIDS Quilt Songbook premiered, a collection of new musical works about the devastation of AIDS compiled by lyric baritone William Parker, who solicited them from composers with whom he had previously worked.
 Washington D.C.'s Different Drummers (DCDD) and the Lesbian and Gay Chorus of Washington (LGCW) commissioned Quilt Panels from composer Robert Maggio, and the piece premiered in 2003.
 The NAMES Project was the basis for the musical Quilt, A Musical Celebration.
 The AIDS Memorial Quilt was mentioned and shown during the years that General Hospital held their Nurses Ball (1994–2001) and raised money for AIDS research. The show's fictional character, Michael "Stone" Cates, was celebrated with a quilt block in 1996.
 In 2002 the NAMES Project Chicago Chapter was inducted into the Chicago Gay and Lesbian Hall of Fame.
 Never to Be Forgotten is a Philo T. Farnsworth Award-winning 54-minute video created by Karen Peper which documents the Quilt's June 1988 visit to Detroit, Michigan. This display was part of a 20-city tour initiated immediately after the 1987 Washington, DC inaugural showing. The video begins with footage of the opening ceremony from the Washington DC display and then moves to coverage of the Detroit event. Included are the opening and closing ceremonies at Cobo Hall along with a look at the set up and take down of the display. Volunteers share their feelings about participating in the event and the viewer is given a close-up look at the individual panels. Peper also shot extensive footage of the Quilt's visit to Columbus, OH; Chicago, IL; and the 1987, 1993, and 1996 Washington, D.C., showings. (All video footage is archived at ONE Archives at the USC Libraries in Los Angeles, CA.)
 The Quilt was displayed on the ABC Soap Opera "One Life to Live" in 1992.
 On Inside Amy Schumer, Schumer joked that comedian Mindy Kaling wore the quilt to an event during a skit mocking sizes in clothing stores.
 On Modern Family season 7 episode 1, Luke joked Haley's quilt was the saddest since the AIDS Quilt.
 Cartoonist Gerard Donelan, specializing in single-panel comics depicting gay men and women in everyday life, contributed cartoons, pamphlets, and posters to the NAMES Project. These pieces were meant to spread awareness about safe-sex practices for gay people and to garner support for the NAMES Project.

Projects inspired by NAMES
The AIDS Memorial Quilt was the first of its kind as a continually growing monument created piecemeal by thousands of individuals, and as of 2007, it constituted the largest piece of community folk art in the world. The Quilt was followed by, and inspired a number of memorials and awareness projects, both AIDS-related and otherwise. Examples of these include:
 The K.I.A. Memorial Quilt, created to remember those U.S. Armed Forces members killed in the Iraq War.
 Following the September 11, 2001 terrorist attacks on America a number of quilt projects were created memorializing the victims.
 September 11 Quilts Memorial Exhibition
 United In Memory
 The World Trade Center Memorial Quilt
 America's 9-11 Memorial Quilts
 Many other medical conditions also now have quilts, for example:
 Huntington's disease
 Congenital heart disease
 Breast cancer

There are also quilts for sub-sects of the AIDS Pandemic, including Children, 2010, North Californians, 2008, Australians, 2009, New Zealand, 2017.

"Virtual" AIDS Memorial Quilts have also been created:
 Project Stitch "Digital Quilt"
 Second Life
 AIDS Action Committee of Massachusetts
 Southern AIDS Living Quilt
 Columbia University AIDS Memorial

Display location

In November 2019 the NAMES Project Foundation and House Speaker Nancy Pelosi announced that the quilt would relocate to San Francisco under the permanent care and stewardship of the National AIDS Memorial starting in 2020.  The Project's archives were gifted to the joint care with the American Folklife Center at the U.S. Library of Congress, allowing for greater public access.  This action returns the quilt to San Francisco, where the project began.

See also

 Art of the AIDS Crisis
 New York City AIDS Memorial

References

Further reading
 New York Memorial Quilt records, 1988 (3 inches) are housed at the New York State Archives.
 Robert Garcia Papers, 1988–1993 (9 cubic feet) are housed at the Cornell University Library Division of Rare and Manuscript Collection.
 Jim Graham Papers, 1961-2015 (80.5 linear feet) are housed at the George Washington University Special Collections Research Center.
 Vito Russo Papers, 1969–1990 (21 linear feet) are housed at the New York Public Library.
 Washington Blade Lou Chibbaro Senior Report files, 1980–2001 (39 linear feet) are housed at the George Washington University Special Collections Research Center..
 2362 Market Street Stories by Patricia Wakida, 2012 Smithsonian Folklife Festival, Creativity in Crisis, blog profile of Gert McMullin
 Dupré, Judith (2007). Monuments: America's History in Art and Memory. New York: Random House.

External links

 National AIDS Memorial website
 Documentary and overview description of the 1996 quilt display
 "National Coalition to Save Our Mall: The AIDS Memorial Quilt" (archived)

HIV/AIDS activism
Monuments and memorials in the United States
Organizations based in Atlanta
Tourist attractions in Atlanta
Quilts
1987 works
LGBT culture in Atlanta
History of San Francisco
1987 establishments in California
1987 in San Francisco
HIV/AIDS memorials
HIV/AIDS
Embroidery in the United States
HIV/AIDS in the United States